Chicken Express is a regional chain of fast food restaurants concentrated in the Southern United States.

History
Chicken Express was established in 1988 by Richard and Nancy Stuart's Stuart Group Inc. The first restaurant opened in March 1988 in Benbrook, Texas.

Present day

The restaurant serves fried chicken, catfish, chicken tenders, and side dishes. The chain is also known for their iced tea, which they sell by the gallon. Chicken Express is headquartered in Burleson, Texas and has over 200 locations in Texas, Arkansas, Louisiana and Oklahoma.

See also
 List of fast-food chicken restaurants

References

External links

Companies based in Texas
Restaurants in Texas
Economy of the Southeastern United States
Economy of the Southwestern United States
Regional restaurant chains in the United States
Fast-food chains of the United States
Restaurants established in 1988
Fast-food poultry restaurants
Fast-food franchises
1988 establishments in Texas
Tarrant County, Texas
Chicken chains of the United States